The Hermitage Arboretum is an arboretum located on the grounds of The Hermitage, President Andrew Jackson's antebellum cotton plantation outside Nashville, Tennessee in the Hermitage neighborhood.

The arboretum lines the  trail between the visitor's center and the mansion, and contains labeled trees. Although the 1998 Nashville tornado outbreak destroyed many of the older trees on the grounds, several remaining trees may date from Jackson's lifetime.

See also
 List of botanical gardens in the United States

Arboreta in Tennessee
Botanical gardens in Tennessee
Parks in Nashville, Tennessee
Protected areas of Davidson County, Tennessee